Palestina (lit. Palestine) is a municipality (município) in the state of São Paulo, Brazil. The population is 13,123 (2020 est.) in an area of 696.6 km².

Palestina belongs to the Mesoregion of São José do Rio Preto.

Economy
The Tertiary sector corresponds to 59,08% of the Palestina GDP. The Secondary sector is 6.47% of the GDP. The Primary sector is relevant, with 34.4% of the city GDP.

References

Municipalities in São Paulo (state)